Cleopatra Testing Poisons on Condemned Prisoners (Cléopâtre essayant des poisons sur des condamnés à mort) is an 1887 painting by the French artist Alexandre Cabanel. It is held by the Royal Museum of Fine Arts Antwerp. It shows Cleopatra VII reclining on a banquette and observing the effects of poisons on prisoners condemned to death, as described in Mark Antony's Plutarch's Lives. It is considered a canonical work of 19th-century orientalism and has been used as a model for plays and early films.

Cabanel had always had a taste for historical and orientalist themes and when the painting was first seen by the Parisian public he was fêted by the critics and showered with honours. Several international collectors attempted to buy the painting.

References

1887 paintings
Paintings in the collection of the Royal Museum of Fine Arts Antwerp
Paintings depicting Cleopatra
Deaths by poisoning
Paintings by Alexandre Cabanel
Paintings based on works by Plutarch
Paintings about death
Cats in art